The Société des gens de lettres de France (SGDLF;) is a writers' association founded in 1838 by the notable French authors Honoré de Balzac, Victor Hugo, Alexandre Dumas, and George Sand. 

It is a private association recognised in France as an establishment in the public interest by decree of 10 December 1891.  

Members of the society must be writers whose work has been published by a publishing house (self-published works do not qualify). It is directed by a volunteer committee consisting of twenty-four writers, and is currently led by the novelist Alain Absire.

Purpose
It is the only writer-run writers' association in France with the expressed aim of defending the moral rights, the legal interests, and the social and legal status of all writers. It protects, considers, and proposes new rules and arrangements for the benefit of the community of writers.  

The SGDLF offers social and legal assistance to its members. It has facilities for the deposit of completed works, helping writers guarantee their rights as original author in case of a legal dispute. Each year it organises diverse cultural events and awards a number of €75,000 prizes in recognition of published works.

Headquarters
The SGDLF occupies the 18th-century neoclassical Hôtel de Massa on rue de Faubourg-Saint-Jacques in the  14th arrondissement of Paris.  It is building with the strange history of having been moved stone by stone in 1928, from its original site on the Champs-Élysées to its present site in the garden of the Observatoire de Paris.

Prizes of the Société des gens de lettres

Spring session 
Prizes recognising the entire oeuvre of an author
Grand prix de littérature de la SGDL, founded in 1947
Grand prix de poésie de la SGDL, founded in 1983
Prix Paul Féval de littérature populaire, founded in 1984
Prizes recognising a single work
Grand Prix SGDL du roman,  founded in 1947
Grand Prix SGDL de la nouvelle,  founded in 1984
Grand Prix SGDL du livre d'Histoire / Essai,  founded in 1986
Grand Prix SGDL du livre Jeunesse,  founded in 1982
Prix de poésie Charles Vildrac,  founded in 1973
Grand Prix SGDL de l'œuvre Multimédia

Fall session
Prizes recognising the entire oeuvre of an author
Grand Prix Poncetton de la SGDL, founded in 1970
Prix de Poésie Louis Montalte, founded in 1992
Prizes recognising a single work
Grand Prix Thyde Monnier de la SGDL, founded in 1975
Bourses Thyde Monnier, since 1975
Bourses Poncetton
Prizes for translation
Prix Halpérine-Kaminsky Consécration, since 1993
Prix Halpérine-Kaminsky Découverte, since 1993
Prix Gérard de Nerval
Prix Baudelaire
Prix Maurice-Edgar Coindreau

See also 

 French literature
 Academy
 Encyclopédistes

External links
 —SGDL−Société des gens de lettres website

French writers' organizations
Gens de lettres
French literature
French literary awards
Arts organizations based in France
Learned societies of France
Organizations based in Paris
Organizations established in 1838
1838 establishments in France
14th arrondissement of Paris